Lord of Shanghai is a 2016 Chinese action film co-written, produced and directed by Sherwood Hu and stars Hu Jun, Yu Nan, Rhydian Vaughan, and Qin Hao. The film is an adaptation of Hong Ying's novel of the same name. It picks up the story of three generations of the Lord of Shanghai and their love story of the legendary woman Xiao Yuegui. The film was first released in China on February 17, 2017.

A sequel, Lord of Shanghai II, directed again by Wu and featuring most of the cast with the addition of Amber Kuo, was released on August 22, 2020.

Plot
In the early 20th century. Xiao Yuegui (Yu Nan) is sold as a maid to a Shanghai brothel, where Madam Dai Yu (Bai Ling) doesn't like her because she has a no-count big foot with big breasts. But soon she becomes a lover of Chang Lixong (Hu Jun), who is the gang leader of Hong society. After meeting with Huang Peiyu (Qin Hao), a leader of the secret society and underground resistance movement Tongmenghui, Chang Lixong is assassinated during an escape by Huang Peiyu wife. Xiao Yuegui becomes helpless and then goes to the countryside, where she gives birth to a daughter.

Years later, Xiao Yuegui organizes a theatrical troupe named "Tanhuang Banzi", and she returns to Shanghai. Under the patronage of the second generation lord of Shanghai Huang Peiyu, she rose to prominence. After falling in love with Huang she learns that he was involved in the assassination of her husband Chang Lixiong. Xiao Yuegui persuades Yu Qiyang (Rhydian Vaughan), an attendant to both lords of Shanghai, to promote justice. After Huang's death, Yu Qiyang replaces him to become the third generation lord of Shanghai.

Cast
 Hu Jun as Chang Lixiong, gang leader, the first generation lord of Shanghai.
 Yu Nan as Xiao Yuegui, a native of Pudong District, Shanghai, lover of three generations of the Lord of Shanghai.
 Vivien Li as young Xiao Yuegui
 Rhydian Vaughan as Yu Qiyang, the third generation lord of Shanghai.
 Qin Hao as Huang Peiyu, the second generation lord of Shanghai.
 Liu Peiqi as Song Shoubei
 Cao Kefan as Private adviser
 Purba Rgyal as Childe Lu
 Tobgyal as General Lu
 Johann Urb as Jensen
 Xu Dongdong as Lu Xianglan, a concubine of Huang Peiyu.
 Bai Ling as Dai Yu
 He Saifei

Production
In 2003, Sherwood Hu bought the film rights to the 2003 novel Lord of Shanghai written by Hong Ying. Hu has said he had spent ten years developing the film.

Music

Release
On June 20, 2016, the producers released a set of concept posters. On December 15, the producers released an official trailer.

On January 16, 2017, the producers held a release conference in Beijing, it was announced that the release date for Lord of Shanghai will be on February 24. On February 10, it was announced that the film has been advanced to February 17.

The film premiered at Shanghai International Film Festival on June 19, 2016, and opened in China on February 17, 2017.

The film received mainly negative reviews, although it won several awards at the 8th Macau International Movie Festival.

Box office
The film grossed 13 million yuan in Chinese box office.

Accolades

References

External links
 
 
 

2016 films
Films based on Chinese novels
Films set in the Republic of China (1912–1949)
2010s Mandarin-language films
Chinese action films
Films set in Shanghai
Films shot in Shanghai
Films scored by Johnny Klimek